Antonio Carlos Ortega Pérez (born 14 July 1971) is a former Spanish handball player who is the current head coach of FC Barcelona.

He competed in the 2000 Summer Olympics and in the 2004 Summer Olympics. In 2000 he won the bronze medal with the Spanish team. He played all eight matches and scored 31 goals. Four years later he  finished seventh with the Spanish handball team in the 2004 Olympic tournament. He played all seven matches and scored 23 goals.

References
 

1971 births
Living people
Spanish male handball players
FC Barcelona Handbol players
Olympic handball players of Spain
Handball players at the 2000 Summer Olympics
Handball players at the 2004 Summer Olympics
Olympic bronze medalists for Spain
Sportspeople from Málaga
Olympic medalists in handball
Medalists at the 2000 Summer Olympics
Spanish expatriates in Japan
Spanish expatriate sportspeople in Germany
21st-century Spanish people